Loki – Wizja Dźwięku is the debut solo album by Polish rock singer Piotr Rogucki, frontman of the band Coma. It was released on  March 21, 2011 through Polish label Mystic Production. The album peaked at number 2 on the official Polish sales chart OLiS.

Background and composition
Piotr Rogucki has begun his career performing solo with a guitar, and formed Coma several years later. He has said that he was always planning to release a solo album, to have an outlet for different kind of expression than the one presented while playing with Coma. Loki – Wizja Dźwięku was, according to Rogucki, a "soundtrack to a film that was never created." The concept album tells a story of Loki – an eccentric rock musician and troublemaker, loved by companions and women – from the moment he decides to end his musical career, and follows him through various stages of life, from erotic experiences to falls and tragedies.

Promotion
The album was promoted by the lead single "Szatany". A music video for the song was shot by Mateusz Winkiel in an Evangelical Church of the Augsburg Confession in Łódź. Music videos were also released for "Wizja Dźwięku", and live performances of "Piegi w Locie" and "Mała".

Critical reception

Loki – Wizja Dźwięku has received positive reviews from music critics.

Track listing

Personnel
 Piotr Rogucki – lead and background vocals
 Marian Wróblewski – production, arrangement, guitar, bass guitar, keyboards, background vocals, harmonica, harmonium, tambourine, trombone, banjo
 Maciej Cieślak – drums, percussion
 Tomasz "Zed" Zalewski – vocals, background vocals, mixing, mastering
 Kuba Galiński – keyboards, harmonium, arrangement
 Wojtek Traczyk – bass guitar, arrangement
 Marcin Ułanowski – drums, percussion, tambourine, arrangement
 Paweł Tomaszewski – recitation, dialogues

Charts

References

2011 albums
Piotr Rogucki albums
Mystic Production albums
Concept albums
Polish-language albums